The Employment Relations Act 1999 (Blacklists) Regulations 2010  is a UK labour law regulation which penalises a practice of listing trade union members for the purpose of discrimination against them, and potentially leads to criminal sanctions for employers and agencies who do so.

Background
In 2009, the Information Commission's Office found that a group called the "Consulting Association" had compiled lists of trade unionists to exclude people from employment in the building industry. John McDonnell described this as "one of the worst ever cases of organised abuses of human rights in the UK". It resulted in the 2010 Regulations specifying the wrong and penalties.

Summary
regulation 3(1) prohibits the compilation, use, sale or supply of a prohibited list which ‘contains details of persons who are or have been members of trade unions or persons who are taking part or have taken part in the activities of trade unions’ and (2) compiled ‘with a view to being used by employers or employment agencies for the purposes of discrimination in relation to recruitment or in relation to the treatment of workers’. (3) discrimination is ‘treating a person less favourably than another on grounds of trade union membership or trade union activities’. (4) union membership of any branch.
regulation 5, states refusal of employment unlawful
regulation 6, refusal of employment agency services unlawful
regulation 13, says the nature of the claim is a breach of statutory duty, and (3) the court can order as appropriate, award damages including injury to feelings.

See also
UK labour law
Consulting Association

References

External links
Text of original regulations

United Kingdom labour law
2010 in British law
2010 in labor relations
Statutory Instruments of the United Kingdom